The 1953–54 Scottish League Cup was the eighth season of Scotland's second football knockout competition. The competition was won by East Fife, who defeated Partick Thistle in the Final.

First round

Group 1

Group 2

Group 3

Group 4

Group 5

Group 6

Group 7

Group 8

Quarter-finals

First Leg

Second Leg

Semi-finals

Final

References

General

Specific

1953-54 in Scottish football
1953-54